Velarde may refer to:
Velarde, New Mexico
Velarde CF, Spanish football team
Velarde map, a 1734 map of the Philippine

People
Carlos Velarde (born 1990), Mexican boxer
Efraín Velarde (born 1986), Mexican football player
Enrique Gorostieta Velarde (1889–1929), Mexican soldier
Fabiola León-Velarde (born 1956), Peruvian physiologist
F. X. Velarde (1897–1960), English architect
Jorge Velarde (born 1960), Ecuadorian painter
Joyo Velarde (born 1974), Filipino singer
Juan Velarde (disambiguation), several people
Luis Galarreta (born 1971), Peruvian politician
Mario Velarde (1940–1997), Mexican football player
Mike Velarde (born 1939), Filipino religious leader
Pablita Velarde (1918–2006), American painter
Pedro Murillo Velarde, Spanish Jesuit cartographer and publisher of the Velarde map
Pedro Velarde y Santillán (1779–1808), Spanish soldier
Ramón López Velarde (1888–1921), Mexican poet
Randy Velarde (born 1962), American baseball player
Sergio Tovar Velarde (born 1982), Mexican film producer
Silvia Velarde Pereyra (born 1970), known as Sibah, Bolivian singer-songwriter

See also
Fabian Velardes (born 1984), Argentine middleweight boxer
Fernando Orlando Velárdez (born 1981), American lightweight boxer
Velardi, a surname